At the 1992 Summer Olympics in Barcelona, 20 wrestling events were contested, for men only. There were 10 weight classes in each of the freestyle wrestling and Greco-Roman wrestling disciplines.

Medal summary

Freestyle

Greco-Roman

Medal table

Participating nations
A total of 370 wrestlers from 59 nations competed at the Barcelona Games:

References

Sources
 
Official Olympic Report

 
1992 Summer Olympics events
O
1992